The Environment and Conservation Organisations of Aotearoa New Zealand (ECO) was formed in 1971 under the name of CoEnCo and changed its name to ECO in 1976.

It is a non-profit umbrella group and network of around 50 organisations and publish ecolink (ISSN 1174-0671), a quarterly newsletter sent out to members and supporters.

Member organisations

Action for Environment Inc.
Appropriate Technology for Living Association
Bay of Islands Coastal Watchdog
Bay of Islands Maritime Park
Baywatch Hawkes Bay Environment Group
Buller Conservation Group
Civic Trust Auckland
Clean Stream Waiheke
Conscious Consumers
Coromandel Watchdog of Hauraki
Cycling Action Network
East Harbour Environmental Association
Eastern Bay of Islands Preservation Society
EcoMatters Environment Trust
Engineers for Social Responsibility
Environmental Futures
Friends of Golden Bay
Friends of Lewis Pass and Hurunui Catchment
Friends of Nelson Haven and Tasman Bay
Friends of the Earth - NZ
Gecko - Victoria University Environment Group
Greenpeace Aotearoa New Zealand
Guardians of Pauatahanui Inlet
Initial Volco Trust
Island Bay Marine Education Centre
Kaipatiki Project
Marlborough Environment Centre INC
Monarch Butterfly NZ Trust
National Council of Women of NZ
Nelson Environment Centre
North Canterbury branch Forest & Bird
Orari River Protection Group (Inc)
Organics Aotearoa New Zealand
Pacific Institute of Resource Management
RESPONSE Trust
Save the Otago Peninsula
Soil & Health Association of NZ
South Coast Environment Society
Students for Environmental Action
Surfbreak Protection Society
Sustainable Whanganui Trust
Te Aroha Earthwatch
Thames Coast Preservation and Protection Society
The Sandy Walker Group
Wellington Botanical Society INC
Wellington Tramping and Mountaineering Club
West Coast Environment Network
Whaingaroa Environment Centre
Wildlife Society, NZVA
Yellow Eyed Penguin Trust

As well as these member groups, ECO has around 500 'Friends' of ECO, made up of individuals and other groups. ECO relies on funding from membership, grants and donations for its work.

See also
List of environmental organizations
Forest and Bird and Greenpeace Aotearoa New Zealand (a member organisations)

External links

Environmental organisations based in New Zealand